(1773–1849) was a Polish ethnographer, historian, translator and librarian. In 1794, he fought as a Polish army officer in the Kościuszko Uprising against Russia and participated in the Battle of Szczekociny.

Kościuszko insurgents
Polish ethnographers
Polish librarians
Polish translators
1773 births
1849 deaths